Gondrezick is a surname.  Notable people with the surname include:

 Glen Gondrezick (1955–2009), American basketball player, brother of Grant
 Grant Gondrezick (1963–2021), American basketball player
 Kysre Gondrezick (born 1997), American basketball player